István Tamássy (1911 – 30 May 1994) was a Hungarian football forward who played for Hungary in the 1934 FIFA World Cup. He also played for Újpest FC.

References

External links
 FIFA profile

Hungarian footballers
Hungary international footballers
Association football forwards
Újpest FC players
1934 FIFA World Cup players
1911 births
Year of death missing